Ocker may refer to:

 ocker, a word used to refer to Australian people
 Ocker (surname)
 Ocker Hill, Tipton, England